Phạm Thị Liên (范氏蓮, 1758–1791) was an empress consort of Tây Sơn dynasty, Vietnam.

Born in Quy Nhơn, Bình Định Province. According to Đại Nam chính biên liệt truyện, she was maternal half-sister of Bùi Đắc Tuyên and Bùi Văn Nhật. She married Nguyễn Huệ, and was crowned the empress and received the noble title Chính Cung hoàng hậu (正宮皇后) when she was thirty. She had three sons and two daughters, the eldest son was Nguyễn Quang Toản.

Liên died in 1791, and received the posthumous name Nhân Cung Ðoan Tĩnh Trinh Thục Nhu Thuần Vũ Hoàng chính hậu (仁恭端靜貞淑武皇正后).

References

1758 deaths
1791 deaths
People from Bình Định province
Tây Sơn dynasty empresses